Nanaimo station is a former railway station in Nanaimo, British Columbia. The station was a stop on the Via Rail  Dayliner service, which closed indefinitely in 2011. The station is located at 336 Prideaux Street, Nanaimo.

History 
The one/two-storey stucco and wood building station building featuring a central square tower, was built in 1920 to replace an earlier station building. The building is a more complex version of the CPR Standard Plan No. 9 design. The original design was intended to support commercial operations on the main floor with living quarters for railway employees on the second floor.

Closure 
On March 19, 2011, Via Rail suspended service indefinitely due to poor track conditions on the line outside Nanaimo and replaced it with a bus service. Eventually, on August 12, 2011, the bus service ended and the station closed indefinitely.

References

External links 

 City of Nanaimo The city the station serviced.

Via Rail stations in British Columbia
Railway stations in Canada opened in 1920
Railway stations closed in 2011
Disused railway stations in Canada
Buildings and structures in Nanaimo
Transport in Nanaimo
Designated Heritage Railway Stations in British Columbia
1920 establishments in British Columbia
2011 disestablishments in British Columbia